Vijayapuri South is a village in Palnadu district of the Indian state of Andhra Pradesh. It is located in Macherla mandal of Gurazala revenue division.

Geography 

Governance 

Vijayapuri South gram panchayat is the local self-government of the village. It is divided into wards and each ward is represented by a ward member.

Education 

As per the school information report for the academic year 2018–19, the village has a total of 8 schools. These include one government, one MPP, 4 private and 2 other type of schools.

References 

Villages in Palnadu district